Claudiu Adrian Mihai Petrila (born 7 November 2000) is a Romanian professional footballer who plays as a winger or an attacking midfielder for Liga I club CFR Cluj and the Romania national team.

Club career
Born in Sânnicolau Român, Bihor County, Petrila started his football career with LPS Bihorul Oradea. At age 14, he was loaned out along with other players from his age group to fourth division side FC Hidișelu de Sus, where he debuted as a senior. He then had an unsuccessful trial with Sampdoria in Italy, before moving to the academy of Liga I club CFR Cluj.

On 8 December 2018, manager Toni Conceição handed 18-year-old Petrila his professional debut for CFR in a 2–2 league draw with Gaz Metan Mediaș. He scored his first goal on 23 August 2020, in a 2–1 away victory over Academica Clinceni. After making six appearances in the 2020–21 Liga I, he was sent on loan to Sepsi OSK for the remainder of the season, where he totalled five goals from 26 games in all competitions.

Upon his return in Cluj-Napoca in July 2021, he netted in the consecutive 3–2 and 2–1 league wins over FC U Craiova and Academica Clinceni, respectively. On 30 September 2021, Petrila scored his first European goal in a 1–1 draw with Danish club Randers in the UEFA Europa Conference League group stage.

Style of play
Petrila can play as an attacking midfielder or a winger on either flank. He has been acknowledged for his pace and dribbling skills.

Career statistics

Club

International

Honours
CFR Cluj
Liga I: 2018–19, 2019–20, 2020–21, 2021–22
Supercupa României: 2020; runner-up: 2019, 2021, 2022

Individual
Gala Fotbalului Românesc Romanian Young Footballer of the Year: 2021

References

External links

Claudiu Petrila at Liga Profesionistă de Fotbal 

2000 births
Living people
People from Bihor County
Romanian footballers
Association football midfielders
Association football wingers
Liga I players
CFR Cluj players
Sepsi OSK Sfântu Gheorghe players
Romania youth international footballers
Romania under-21 international footballers